Anthony Ha-Jin Kim (born June 19, 1985) is an American professional golfer with three PGA Tour wins, who played in one Ryder Cup competition, and one Presidents Cup competition. He has not played in a PGA Tour event since an injury in 2012. He is believed to have had an insurance policy that would pay him $10-20 million in the case of a career-ending injury.

Amateur career
A Korean American, Kim was born in Los Angeles, California, and resides in Dallas, Texas. He attended La Quinta High School in La Quinta, California. After high school, he attended the University of Oklahoma for three years; this is where he met his caddie, Brodie Flanders. He was part of the winning USA team in the 2005 Walker Cup.

Professional career

2006–2010 
Kim turned professional in 2006 and after receiving a sponsor's exemption he finished in a tie for second on his PGA Tour debut at the 2006 Valero Texas Open. He earned his PGA Tour card through the qualifying school for the 2007 season. He made a strong start and broke into the top 100 in the Official World Golf Rankings in May 2007 with four top 10 finishes during his rookie season on the PGA Tour. In the 2007 U.S. Open, he shot a final round 67 earning him a tie for 20th place (he started the day at T57).  His 67 was the lowest for the round and second lowest for the tournament.

In May 2008, Kim won his first PGA Tour tournament at the Wachovia Championship, defeating former British Open champion Ben Curtis by five shots. Kim's 16-under par 272 total was the lowest score in the tournament's history until 2015. He shot an opening day 70, but rallied for subsequent rounds of 67-66-69 and was several shots clear of Curtis most of the final round. He earned $1,152,000 for his victory, and reached a new career high of 16th in the world rankings.

In July 2008, Kim won his second PGA Tour tournament at the AT&T National, defeating Freddie Jacobson by two shots. Kim shot a 5 under 65 in the fourth round to capture the title. The victory was especially meaningful because the tournament is hosted by Tiger Woods. Furthermore, Kim became the first American under 25 to win twice in one year on the PGA Tour since Tiger Woods in 2000. This win moved him to 14th in the World Rankings. A pair of T-3 finishes in the final two 2008 FedEx Cup events pushed him to 6th in the World Rankings. He has spent over 20 weeks in the top-10 since 2008.

In September 2008, Kim was a critical part of the United States' victory in the Ryder Cup at Valhalla Golf Club, defeating Ryder Cup veteran Sergio García 5 & 4 in the first match of the Sunday single matches. Later that year he joined the European Tour for the 2009 season, making his debut as a member at the 2008 HSBC Champions, the first tournament of the 2009 season.

At the 2009 Masters Tournament in Augusta, Georgia at Augusta National Golf Club, Kim set the record for most birdies in a round with eleven in the second round, surpassing Nick Price, who had ten birdies in 1986.

At the 2009 Presidents Cup, Kim posted an impressive 3–1 record, which included a 5 and 3 victory over Robert Allenby in the Sunday singles match.

Kim lost to Ross Fisher in the finals of the Volvo World Match Play in October 2009 4 & 3 after once again beating Robert Allenby in the semi-finals.

On April 4, 2010, Kim won the Shell Houston Open, beating Vaughn Taylor in a playoff. He became only the fifth player in 30 years to have won three times on the PGA Tour before the age of 25, the others being Tiger Woods, Phil Mickelson, Sergio García and Adam Scott. An injury hampered most of the rest of the 2010 season for Kim, and he failed to qualify for the 2010 Ryder Cup.

2011–present 
In June 2012, Kim had surgery after injuring the Achilles tendon in his left leg and was expected to miss 9 to 12 months. Kim was eligible for the 2013 season on a Major Medical Exemption, but has failed to play a single tournament since.

In April 2014, Golf Channel reported that Kim no longer plays golf, even on a recreational level. In 2016, Kim played in a number of charity events, but says he is not ready to play professionally again. He also cited ongoing physical therapy and numerous surgeries as the reasons for delaying his return.

In April 2019, during an encounter with a fan in West Hollywood, California, Kim referred to his golf game as "non-existent". On January 1, 2021, Adam Schriber, Kim's longtime coach, posted a photo of the two in front of the Dallas skyline with the caption "2021 is going to be special".

Amateur wins
Note: this list may be incomplete.
2004 Northeast Amateur

Professional wins (4)

PGA Tour wins (3)

PGA Tour playoff record (1–0)

Other wins (1)

Other playoff record (1–2)

Results in major championships

CUT = missed the half-way cut
T = tie

Summary

Most consecutive cuts made – 7 (2007 U.S. Open – 2009 U.S. Open)
Longest streak of top-10s – 1 (three times)

Results in The Players Championship

CUT = missed the halfway cut
"T" indicates a tie for a place

Results in World Golf Championships

QF, R16, R32, R64 = Round in which player lost in match play
"T" = Tied
Note that the HSBC Champions did not become a WGC event until 2009.

PGA Tour career summary

* Rank as of the 2015–16 season, the last time he appeared on the career money list

U.S. national team appearances
Amateur
Walker Cup: 2005 (winners)

Professional
Ryder Cup: 2008 (winners)
Presidents Cup: 2009 (winners)

Media work
Kim participated in the fourth episode of the second season of Shaq Vs., which aired on August 24, 2010. In the episode, Kim teamed up with Shaquille O'Neal against fellow golf pro Bubba Watson and NBA Hall of Famer Charles Barkley in a five-hole match. Team Shaq won in sudden death with O'Neal making the winning twenty-five foot putt.

See also
2006 PGA Tour Qualifying School graduates

References

External links

Profile in Wall Street Journal

American male golfers
Oklahoma Sooners men's golfers
PGA Tour golfers
European Tour golfers
Ryder Cup competitors for the United States
Golfers from Los Angeles
Golfers from Dallas
American sportspeople of Korean descent
People from La Quinta, California
1985 births
Living people